Nuku-Hiva is a commune of French Polynesia, an overseas territory of France in the Pacific Ocean. The commune is in the administrative subdivision of the Marquesas Islands. Its population was 2,951 at the 2017 census.

The commune of Nuku-Hiva is made up of the island of Nuku Hiva proper, which contains the entire population of the commune, and the uninhabited islands of:

Nuka-Hiva consists of the following associated communes:
Hatiheu
Taiohae
Taipivai

The administrative centre of the commune is the settlement of Taiohae, on the southern side of the island of Nuku Hiva.

References

Communes of French Polynesia
Geography of the Marquesas Islands